Zou Jiahua (born October 1926) is a retired high-ranking politician of the People's Republic of China. He served as China's Vice Premier from 1991 to 1998, Vice-Chairman of the 9th National People's Congress from 1998 to 2003, and was a member of the Politburo of the Chinese Communist Party from 1992 to 1997.

Early life and career
In 1944, Zou Jiahua joined the New Fourth Army at the age of 18, and joined the Chinese Communist Party in 1945.

From 1948 to 1955 Zou Jiahua studied first at the Harbin Institute of Technology, then later attended the Bauman Moscow State Technical University School of Mechanical Manufacturing, becoming proficient in Russian. His career, like many others in his generation centred on industry. Upon his return to China in 1955, Zou worked as an engineer in Shenyang, Liaoning Province, where he worked as the chief engineer then director of the Second Machine Tool Plant. Eventually in 1973, Zou became the Director of the First Ministry of Machine-Building Industry.

Later career
After 1973, Zou began serving in increasingly responsible positions in State Council bodies. In 1988, Zou became head of the State Planning Commission, where he made decisions to hold major conferences for the integration of Guangxi Province as well as for initiatives for the establishment of regional economic zones. Zou was widely considered a strong proponent of central planning, and was quoted saying that "market mechanisms must take a backseat to economic planning."  However, beginning in early 1992 he publicly echoed Deng Xiaoping's efforts to revive reform; as seen in an early 1992 speech where he praised Guangdong Province's accomplishments in economic reform and high economic growth.

From 1991 to 1998, Zou served as the Vice Premier of the People's Republic of China, and was one of China's point men for negotiations with the west. In 1994, he travelled in Canada and the United States and with then American President Bill Clinton to discuss issues of trade and human rights. As Vice Premier, Zou also visited Japan, the United Kingdom, Italy, Spain, Netherlands, and Germany; and the United States in 1986. He also played an important role in China's early efforts to acquire foreign military technology.

From 1992 to 1997 Zou served as a member of the 14th Central Committee of the Chinese Communist Party and Politburo of China. He was an alternate member of the 11th Central Committee of the Chinese Communist Party and a member of the 12th, 13th and 14th CCP Central Committees. He was a member of the Politburo of the 14th CCP Central Committee. In March 1998, Zou was elected vice-chairman of the 9th National People's Congress Standing Committee.

Family
 His father Zou Taofen (邹韬奋; 1895–1944) was a well-known intellectual, journalist, and political commentator in Shanghai in the 1930s.
 His wife Ye Chumei is the daughter of Ye Jianying.
 His brother Zou Jingmeng (邹竞蒙; 1929–1999) was head of the China Meteorological Administration and president of the World Meteorological Organization. In 1999, Zou Jingmeng was murdered in Beijing during a robbery.

Career data

References 

1926 births
Living people
Chongqing Nankai Secondary School alumni
Beijing Institute of Technology alumni
Bauman Moscow State Technical University alumni
People's Republic of China politicians from Shanghai
Chinese Communist Party politicians from Shanghai
Government ministers of the People's Republic of China
Vice Premiers of the People's Republic of China
Members of the 14th Politburo of the Chinese Communist Party
State councillors of China
Vice Chairpersons of the National People's Congress
Chinese military personnel of World War II